The 2022 Sarasota Open was a professional tennis tournament played on clay courts. It was the 12th edition of the tournament which was part of the 2022 ATP Challenger Tour. It took place in Sarasota, Florida, United States between 11 and 17 April 2022.

Singles main-draw entrants

Seeds

 1 Rankings are as of April 4, 2022.

Other entrants
The following players received wildcards into the singles main draw:
  Ryan Harrison
  Michael Mmoh
  Govind Nanda

The following player received entry into the singles main draw using a protected ranking:
  Andrew Harris

The following players received entry into the singles main draw as alternates:
  Nicolas Moreno de Alboran
  Yosuke Watanuki
  Wu Tung-lin

The following players received entry from the qualifying draw:
  Adrian Andreev
  Gijs Brouwer
  Alexis Galarneau
  Christian Harrison
  Rinky Hijikata
  Aleksandar Kovacevic

The following players received entry as lucky losers:
  Max Purcell
  Alex Rybakov
  Mikael Torpegaard

Champions

Singles

 Daniel Elahi Galán def.  Steve Johnson 7–6(9–7), 4–6, 6–1.

Doubles

 Robert Galloway /  Jackson Withrow def.  André Göransson /  Nathaniel Lammons 6–3, 7–6(7–3).

References

2022 ATP Challenger Tour
2022
2022 in American tennis
April 2022 sports events in the United States
2022 in sports in Florida